Krasnoobsk is an urban locality (a work settlement) in Novosibirsky District of Novosibirsk Oblast, Russia, located southeast of Novosibirsk's Kirovsky City District. Krasnoobsk is a Science town (Naukograd) of the Russian Federation. Population: 23,768.

History 
Krasnoobsk was founded in 1970.

Research institutes 
 
 
 
 Institute of Experimental Veterinary Science of Siberia and the Far East
 
 
 
 Siberian Research Technological Design Institute of Processing of Agricultural Products
 Siberian Research Institute of Plant Cultivation and Breeding

Libraries 
 Siberian Scientific Agricultural Library
 Central District Library

Green spaces 
 Krasnoobsk Arboretum
 Forest Park named after Irakly Sinyagin

Gallery

References

External links 
 Official website of Krasnoobsk 
 Park of the Brezhnev period. NGS. Парк брежневского периода. НГС. 

Naukograds
Science and technology in Siberia
Urban-type settlements in Novosibirsk Oblast
Krasnoobsk